Micardia argentata is a species of moth of the family Noctuidae first described by Arthur Gardiner Butler in 1878. It is found in China, Korea and Japan.

The forewings are ochreous white tinged with rufous. The hindwings are ochreous white, sprinkled with brown.

References

Moths described in 1878
Acontiinae
Moths of Japan